Jonathan David Good (born December 7, 1985) is an American professional wrestler and actor. He is currently signed to All Elite Wrestling (AEW), where he performs under the ring name Jon Moxley. He also makes appearances for New Japan Pro-Wrestling (NJPW), where he is a former two-time IWGP United States Champion. He became known for his tenure with WWE, where he performed under the ring name Dean Ambrose from 2011 to 2019.

Good made his professional wrestling debut in 2004, and competed under the Jon Moxley name in several independent promotions such as Heartland Wrestling Association (HWA), Westside Xtreme Wrestling (wXw), Full Impact Pro (FIP), Combat Zone Wrestling (CZW), and Dragon Gate USA (DGUSA). Upon signing with WWE in 2011, he was given the Dean Ambrose name and began competing in the company's developmental territories of Florida Championship Wrestling and NXT, before joining the main roster in November 2012 as a member of The Shield alongside Roman Reigns and Seth Rollins. Ambrose won the WWE United States Championship, his first championship in WWE, in May 2013; his 351-day reign became the longest United States Championship reign since the title came under WWE's ownership. After widespread success, The Shield split in June 2014. Ambrose went on to win the WWE Championship once, the WWE Intercontinental Championship three times, and the WWE Raw Tag Team Championship twice (both times with Rollins), which made him WWE's 27th Triple Crown Champion and 16th Grand Slam Champion. He also won the Money in the Bank ladder match in 2016.

Good left WWE after his contract expired in April 2019, subsequently reverting to his Jon Moxley character and debuting for AEW the following month at their inaugural event, Double or Nothing. He also started working in NJPW and won the IWGP United States Heavyweight Championship in his NJPW debut match in January 2020, becoming the only person thus far to have held WWE's and IWGP's United States championships. He would briefly vacate the title but quickly won it back a second time, and would set a record for the longest reign in the title's history. He also won the AEW World Championship in February of that year, making him the first person to hold championships in AEW and NJPW simultaneously. He would go on to win the  AEW World Championship twice more in 2022, setting records for the most world championship wins and longest cumulative reigns in AEW history. Moxley has headlined eleven AEW pay-per-view events, the most in company history. All totaled between WWE, AEW, and NJPW, he has held 12 total championships (including four world titles and three U.S. titles). 

Regarded as one of the best wrestlers in the world and noted for his deranged and mentally unstable onscreen character, Good has also been recognized for his popularity with audiences; he won the Pro Wrestling Illustrated (PWI) award for Most Popular Wrestler of the Year in 2014, 2015 and 2022, and was named Wrestler of the Year by Sports Illustrated in 2019. He also topped the PWI 500 list of the top 500 wrestlers in the world in 2020. Outside of wrestling, he starred in the action film 12 Rounds 3: Lockdown (2015) and the sports action film Cagefighter: Worlds Collide (2020).

Early life
Jonathan David Good was born in Cincinnati on December 7, 1985. He grew up in Cincinnati's East End, which he said was so deprived that shoplifting was a daily occurrence for everybody he knew because they never had any money. An avid wrestling fan who idolized Bret Hart, he used wrestling as an escape from his rough upbringing by watching videos and reading stories about wrestling's earlier days. He attended Amelia High School in nearby Batavia, but dropped out one year after beginning to train as a wrestler. He supported himself by working minimum-wage jobs in factories, restaurants, and warehouses, but was constantly getting fired because he would skip work if he was booked to wrestle a match that clashed with his job; however, he continued to do so because he knew he "could always find another minimum-wage job". He often used drugs such as cocaine as a teenager, during which time he was also arrested multiple times for shoplifting. He has said that he would have most likely become a forest firefighter if he did not pursue wrestling.

Professional wrestling career

Heartland Wrestling Association (2004–2011)
Good began working for Les Thatcher in the Heartland Wrestling Association (HWA) promotion as a teenager by selling popcorn and setting up the ring. He began training to become a professional wrestler at the age of 18 under the teaching of Thatcher and HWA wrestler Cody Hawk. He made his debut in 2004 under the ring name Jon Moxley. The following year, Moxley won the HWA Tag Team Championship twice, with Jimmy Turner and Ric Byrne respectively. He captured the HWA Heavyweight Championship twice in 2006 by defeating Pepper Parks on both occasions but lost the title to Chad Collyer and Brian Jennings respectively. From mid-2007 to early 2010, Moxley continued to work in the tag team division and held the HWA tag titles once with his trainer Cody Hawk and twice with King Vu. He won the HWA Heavyweight Championship for the third time from Aaron Williams in January 2010, before losing it to Gerome Phillips six months later.

Independent circuit (2006–2011)

In September 2006, Moxley teamed with Hade Vansen to win the IWA World Tag Team Championship in the Puerto Rico based International Wrestling Association. They lost the titles to Chicano and Jeff Jeffrey in November, ending their reign at 69 days. Moxley also wrestled several dark matches for Ring of Honor (ROH) between 2007 and 2009. Moxley started working for Dragon Gate USA (DGUSA) in late 2009. He made his first televised appearance in March, where he defeated Tommy Dreamer in a hardcore match taped for the Mercury Rising pay-per-view. At the Uprising event in Mississauga, Ontario, Canada, Moxley suffered a legitimate injury where his left nipple was nearly severed during a match with Jimmy Jacobs. His last match in DGUSA was against Homicide in January 2011, which Moxley won.

At Full Impact Pro's (FIP) Southern Stampede event on April 17, 2010, Moxley defeated Roderick Strong to win the vacant FIP World Heavyweight Championship. He held the title for 441 days before relinquishing it in July 2011, due to his signing with WWE. Moxley also won Combat Zone Wrestling's CZW World Heavyweight Championship twice in 2010 by defeating B-Boy and Nick Gage, respectively.

World Wrestling Entertainment / WWE

Developmental territories (2011–2012)

Good signed a developmental deal with WWE in April 2011 and joined its developmental territory Florida Championship Wrestling (FCW) under the name Dean Ambrose. Prior to his signing, Good wrestled three try-out matches for WWE in 2006 and 2007.

Ambrose made his televised debut on the July 3 episode of FCW, portraying a villainous character and challenging FCW Jack Brisco 15 Champion Seth Rollins. The following month, Ambrose and Rollins had a 20-minute non-title Iron Man match; the match ended in a draw with neither man scoring a fall. A 30-minute rematch, in which the title was on the line, took place in September which Rollins won through sudden death rules. Ambrose beat Rollins in a non-title match in the first round of a tournament to crown the new FCW Florida Heavyweight Champion. However, Ambrose was unsuccessful in the tournament final against Leo Kruger. Ambrose later cost Rollins his FCW 15 Championship by attacking Damien Sandow during his title match with Rollins, causing a disqualification in the deciding fall. Ambrose later unsuccessfully challenged Sandow for the championship. At an FCW house show on October 21, Ambrose challenged WWE wrestler CM Punk, who was making a guest appearance, to a match in which Ambrose was defeated. Punk would later praise Ambrose after the match.

Ambrose then began a feud with William Regal after he targeted Regal in an unprovoked attack. They would wrestle on the November 7 episode of FCW, with Regal winning. For the next year, Ambrose would obsessively request for another match with Regal. On December 7, Ambrose competed at tapings for an unaired pilot for WWE NXT under the working title Full Sail Ahead at Full Sail University, where he was defeated by Leo Kruger.

In March 2012, Ambrose had a confrontation with veteran hardcore wrestler Mick Foley, claiming that Foley needed to be held accountable for creating a generation of imitators. Ambrose continued to antagonize Foley through Twitter. According to Ambrose, the angle was supposed to culminate in a match between the two, but this never came to fruition due to Foley not being medically allowed to wrestle. Instead, the rivalry was scrapped and Ambrose remained in WWE's developmental system. He competed in a dark match at the first tapings of NXT on May 17, in a loss to Xavier Woods. On an episode of FCW in June, Ambrose challenged Rollins for the FCW Florida Heavyweight Championship but lost. Almost a year after their first match, Ambrose and Regal rematched on the final episode of FCW on July 15. The match would conclude in a no contest after Ambrose repeatedly kneed Regal's head into a ring turnbuckle, causing Regal to bleed from the ear.

The Shield (2012–2014)

On November 18, 2012, Dean Ambrose made his WWE main roster debut at the Survivor Series pay-per-view event alongside Roman Reigns and Seth Rollins, as they delivered a triple powerbomb through an announce table to Ryback during the triple threat main event for the WWE Championship, allowing CM Punk to pin John Cena and retain the title. The trio declared themselves The Shield, vowed to rally against "injustice", and denied working for Punk; however, they routinely emerged from the crowd to attack Punk's opponents, including Ryback and the WWE Tag Team Champions Team Hell No (Daniel Bryan and Kane), thus establishing themselves as villains. This led to a six-man Tables, Ladders, and Chairs match being set up for the TLC pay-per-view event on December 16, where The Shield defeated Ryback and Team Hell No in their debut match. They continued to aid Punk after TLC, both on Raw and at the 2013 Royal Rumble. The night after the Royal Rumble, it was revealed that Punk and his manager Paul Heyman had been paying The Shield to work for them all along. The Shield then quietly ended their association with Punk.

At Elimination Chamber in February, The Shield defeated Ryback, John Cena, and Sheamus. At WrestleMania 29 in April, The Shield won their first WrestleMania match against Sheamus, Randy Orton and Big Show. Ambrose made his singles debut against The Undertaker on the April 26 episode of SmackDown, which he lost by submission. On the May 13 episode of Raw, The Shield's undefeated streak as a team ended in a disqualification loss against WWE Champion John Cena and Team Hell No. At Extreme Rules, Ambrose won the United States Championship by defeating Kofi Kingston. He would successfully defend the title in the following weeks with the help of Reigns and Rollins. On the June 14 episode of SmackDown, The Shield was given their first decisive loss, against Randy Orton and Team Hell No, when Daniel Bryan made Rollins submit. Two days later, Ambrose made his first pay-per-view defense of the United States Championship at Payback, where he defeated Kane by countout. The following month at Money in the Bank, he competed in the World Heavyweight Championship Money in the Bank ladder match but failed to win despite interference from Reigns and Rollins. In August, The Shield allied themselves with Triple H and joined his group The Authority.

Ambrose continued to retain his United States Championship against Rob Van Dam at SummerSlam, Dolph Ziggler at Night of Champions, and Big E Langston at Hell in a Cell. At the Survivor Series pay-per-view, The Shield teamed with Antonio Cesaro and Jack Swagger to take on Rey Mysterio, The Usos, Cody Rhodes and Goldust in a traditional Survivor Series match; although Ambrose was the first man eliminated, Reigns would ultimately win the match for the team. At TLC in December, CM Punk defeated The Shield in a handicap match after Ambrose was accidentally speared by Reigns. At the Royal Rumble on January 26, 2014, Ambrose entered his first Royal Rumble match at number 11 and eliminated three participants, before being eliminated by Reigns. The following night on Raw, The Shield faced Daniel Bryan, John Cena, and Sheamus in order to earn their spot in the Elimination Chamber match for the WWE World Heavyweight Championship. The Shield lost after The Wyatt Family (Bray Wyatt, Erick Rowan, and Luke Harper) interfered, thus starting a feud between the two factions. The Shield would lose to The Wyatt Family at the Elimination Chamber pay-per-view, due to Ambrose abandoning his teammates midway through.

After their feud with The Wyatt Family, The Shield moved on to a rivalry with Kane, turning into heroic characters in the process. The group defeated Kane and the New Age Outlaws (Road Dogg and Billy Gunn) at WrestleMania XXX on April 6. The feud with Kane also prompted The Shield to cease working for Triple H, who reformed Evolution with himself, Batista and Randy Orton to battle them. On April 28, Ambrose surpassed MVP as the longest-reigning United States Champion under the WWE banner. The Shield defeated Evolution in a six-man tag team match at Extreme Rules. The following night on Raw, Triple H forced Ambrose to defend his United States Championship in a 20-man battle royal, which saw Ambrose surviving until the final two before ultimately being eliminated by Sheamus, thus ending his title reign at 351 days. The Shield once again defeated Evolution at Payback in a No Holds Barred elimination match in June. The following night on Raw, Rollins betrayed Ambrose and Reigns and aligned himself with The Authority, breaking up the group.

Feud with Seth Rollins (2014–2015)

Ambrose promptly began feuding with Rollins, which included the duo interfering in each other's matches. During this period, Ambrose and Reigns amicably separated as a team, with Ambrose debuting new ring attire and new entrance music. Ambrose competed the 2014 Money in the Bank ladder match on June 29, which Rollins would win after Kane attacked Ambrose. Ambrose was scheduled to face Rollins at Battleground on July 20, but he was ejected from the arena by Triple H after a pre-match brawl with Rollins. Rollins was later announced as the winner via forfeit, prompting Ambrose to return to the arena and attack Rollins. Ambrose and Rollins eventually wrestled at SummerSlam on August 17 in a lumberjack match, which Ambrose lost after Kane again interfered and Rollins hit Ambrose with his Money in the Bank briefcase. The following night on Raw, Ambrose faced Rollins in a Falls Count Anywhere match, which Ambrose lost by knockout after interference from Kane once again. After the match, Rollins curb stomped his head through cinder blocks, giving Ambrose kayfabe (fictional) "head and spine trauma" and causing him to take a hiatus from WWE. Ambrose returned at Night of Champions in September and attacked Rollins. The duo faced off in a Hell in a Cell match the following month at the namesake event, where Ambrose lost again when the returning Bray Wyatt interfered and attacked him.

After consecutive losses to Wyatt at the Survivor Series and TLC pay-per-views, Ambrose defeated Wyatt in a Boot Camp Match at Tribute to the Troops, before losing to Wyatt yet again in a Miracle on 34th Street Fight on the December 22 episode of Raw. The feud between the two concluded when Wyatt defeated Ambrose in an ambulance match on the January 5, 2015 episode of Raw. At the Royal Rumble on January 25, Ambrose participated in the Royal Rumble match, but was eliminated by Big Show and Kane. Ambrose then began a feud with Intercontinental Champion Bad News Barrett. He failed to win the championship from Barrett at Fastlane and WrestleMania 31. Ambrose defeated Luke Harper at Extreme Rules in a Chicago Street Fight on April 26, his first singles victory on a pay-per-view event since The Shield split up. The following night on Raw, Ambrose competed in the 2015 King of the Ring tournament, but was disqualified from the competition during his quarterfinal match with Sheamus, after interference from Dolph Ziggler.

Ambrose returned to feud with Rollins over the WWE World Heavyweight Championship, defeating him in a non-title match on the May 4 episode of Raw. As a result of this, he was added to Rollins's championship defense at Payback against Randy Orton and Roman Reigns. Rollins would retain his championship. At Elimination Chamber on May 31, Ambrose faced Rollins in a singles match for the championship. He won the match by disqualification after Rollins shoved the referee, but did not win the title, as championships cannot change hands by disqualification. Regardless, Ambrose stole the championship belt from him and challenged Rollins to a ladder match for the title at Money in the Bank on June 14, which he narrowly lost.

After Money in the Bank, Ambrose teamed up with Roman Reigns to defeat Wyatt and Harper at SummerSlam. The following night on Raw, Ambrose and Reigns fought Wyatt and Harper in a SummerSlam rematch, during which Braun Strowman made his WWE debut, helping Harper and Wyatt. At Night of Champions on September 20, Ambrose, Reigns and a returning Chris Jericho were defeated by Wyatt, Harper, and Strowman in a six-man tag team match. After Rollins legitimately injured his knee on November 3, the WWE World Heavyweight Championship was declared vacant; Ambrose entered a 16-man tournament to determine a new champion. After defeating Tyler Breeze in the first round, Dolph Ziggler in the quarterfinals and Kevin Owens in the semifinals, Ambrose ultimately made it to the finals at the Survivor Series main event on November 22 but lost to Reigns.

Championship reigns (2015–2017)

In December, Ambrose won the Intercontinental Championship for the first time after defeating Owens at TLC. He successfully defended the title against Owens and Ziggler multiple times between December and January 2016. Ambrose competed in the 2016 Royal Rumble match for the WWE World Heavyweight Championship, which he lost after being lastly eliminated by eventual winner Triple H. Ambrose would later lose the Intercontinental Championship back to Owens in a five-way match on the February 15 episode of Raw, after Owens pinned Tyler Breeze.

At Fastlane on February 21, Ambrose faced Reigns and Brock Lesnar in a triple threat match to determine the number one contender for the WWE World Heavyweight Championship at WrestleMania 32, but lost after he was pinned by Reigns. The following night on Raw, Ambrose challenged Lesnar to a No Holds Barred street fight match at WrestleMania 32, which Paul Heyman accepted on Lesnar's behalf. He then failed to capture the WWE World Heavyweight Championship from Triple H at the Roadblock event in March. He was also unsuccessful in defeating Lesnar at WrestleMania 32. Following WrestleMania, Ambrose began a rivalry with Chris Jericho. He defeated Jericho at Payback, and again at Extreme Rules in an Asylum match later that month to end the feud.

In May, Ambrose qualified for the 2016 Money in the Bank ladder match, which he would win. Later that same night, he would cash in his Money in the Bank contract and defeat Rollins to win the WWE World Heavyweight Championship for the first time. Ambrose made his first title defense against Rollins on the July 18 episode of Raw, which ended in a draw after a double pinfall. The following night at the 2016 WWE draft, Ambrose was drafted to the SmackDown brand, being the brand's first draft pick and bringing the WWE Championship with him; that same night, he pinned Rollins to retain the championship. At Battleground, Ambrose retained his title against Reigns and Rollins after pinning Reigns. Ambrose then successfully defended the renamed "WWE World Championship" against Dolph Ziggler at SummerSlam in August.

At Backlash on September 11, he lost the title to AJ Styles after Styles performed a low blow and Styles Clash while the referee was incapacitated. Ambrose was unsuccessful in regaining the championship at No Mercy on October 9 in a triple threat match also involving John Cena, who was pinned by Styles. The following month at Survivor Series, Ambrose made up part of Team SmackDown alongside Styles, Bray Wyatt, Randy Orton and Shane McMahon in a winning effort over Team Raw. He would face Styles once again in a Tables, Ladders, and Chairs match at TLC for the WWE title. During the match, James Ellsworth interfered and pushed Ambrose off a ladder through multiple tables, allowing Styles to retain the title. Ambrose would then fail to become the number one contender for the reverted WWE Championship in a fatal four-way elimination match involving Dolph Ziggler, Luke Harper, and The Miz.

On the January 3, 2017 episode of SmackDown, Ambrose defeated The Miz to win the Intercontinental Championship for the second time. He participated in the 2017 Royal Rumble match in which he lasted almost 27 minutes before being eliminated by Brock Lesnar. On February 12, Ambrose took part in the WWE Championship Elimination Chamber match at the event of the same name, where he eliminated Baron Corbin with a roll-up pin only for Corbin to attack him afterward, allowing Miz to eliminate Ambrose. A match was set between Ambrose and Corbin at the WrestleMania 33 pre-show on April 2, where Ambrose retained his Intercontinental Championship. Two nights later on SmackDown, Ambrose wrestled in his final match for the brand, in a losing effort to Corbin in a non-title match. Following that, Ambrose was moved to the Raw brand as a result of the Superstar Shake-up. He would then continue his feud with The Miz, who was also drafted to Raw in the Superstar Shake-up, eventually losing the Intercontinental title to him at Extreme Rules in June, thus ending his reign at 152 days. Ambrose continued to feud with The Miz, leading up to a rematch for the Intercontinental Championship at Great Balls of Fire on July 9, where he lost as a result of interference by The Miztourage (Curtis Axel and Bo Dallas).

The Shield reunion and injury (2017–2018)

On the July 10 episode of Raw, Seth Rollins saved Ambrose from an attack by The Miz and The Miztourage. After Rollins failed to gain Ambrose's trust for several weeks, the two argued in the ring on the August 14 episode of Raw and eventually brawled with each other before fighting off Cesaro and Sheamus, reuniting the team. At SummerSlam on August 20, Ambrose and Rollins defeated Cesaro and Sheamus to win the WWE Raw Tag Team Championship, making Ambrose both a Triple Crown and Grand Slam champion in the process. Ambrose and Rollins successfully defended the titles against Cesaro and Sheamus at No Mercy, after Ambrose pinned Sheamus.

On the October 9 episode of Raw, Ambrose and Rollins reunited with Roman Reigns. The newly reformed Shield was due to face the team of Braun Strowman, Cesaro, Kane, The Miz and Sheamus at TLC in a 5-on-3 handicap Tables, Ladders and Chairs match, but Reigns was replaced by Kurt Angle over an illness concern. Ambrose, Rollins, and Angle would go on to win the match. Ambrose and Rollins were scheduled to face SmackDown Tag Team Champions The Usos in an interbrand match at Survivor Series, but lost the tag titles back to Cesaro and Sheamus on the November 6 episode of Raw after a distraction from SmackDown's The New Day (Big E, Kofi Kingston, and Xavier Woods), thus ending their reign at 78 days. This led to a match between The Shield and The New Day at Survivor Series two weeks later, which the former won. In December 2017, Ambrose suffered a triceps injury, reportedly rendering him out of action for nine months.

Final storylines and departure (2018–2019)

On the August 13, 2018 episode of Raw, Ambrose returned with a new look consisting of short hair, a full beard, and a more muscular physique. He assisted Rollins against an attack from Drew McIntyre and Dolph Ziggler. Six days later, he assisted Rollins in winning the Intercontinental Championship from Ziggler at SummerSlam. The following night on Raw, Ambrose and Rollins aided Universal Champion Roman Reigns in attacking Braun Strowman when the latter attempted to cash-in his Money in the Bank contract, once again reuniting The Shield. At Hell in a Cell, Ambrose and Rollins were unsuccessful in defeating Ziggler and McIntyre for the Raw Tag Team Championship. In October, The Shield defeated Ziggler, McIntyre, and Strowman at Super Show-Down. Two nights later on Raw, they were defeated by the same trio in a rematch. After the match, a frustrated Ambrose walked away from his teammates.

On the October 22 episode of Raw, after Reigns announced the return of his real-life leukemia and relinquished the Universal Championship, Ambrose and Rollins defeated Ziggler and McIntyre to capture the Raw Tag Team Championship for the second time. However, Ambrose immediately attacked Rollins after the match, turning heel for the first time since 2014. Two weeks later on Raw, Ambrose attacked Rollins again, after Rollins lost the tag titles in a handicap match against AOP (Akam and Rezar).

The following week, Ambrose burned his Shield vest and explained that being part of the group had made him weak. He would continue to taunt Rollins over the following weeks by stalking him, getting vaccinated against what he perceived to be Rollins's "illness", and ordering his own personal SWAT team to attack Rollins, subsequently christening himself the "Moral Compass of WWE". Ambrose defeated Rollins at TLC in December to win the Intercontinental Championship, beginning his third reign with title. Throughout the following weeks, he successfully defended his title against Tyler Breeze, Apollo Crews, and Rollins, before losing the championship to Bobby Lashley on the January 14, 2019 episode of Raw, in a triple threat match also involving Rollins, ending his reign at 29 days.

Ambrose entered the 2019 Royal Rumble match at number 14, but was eliminated by Aleister Black. The following night on Raw, he interrupted Royal Rumble winner Rollins and Triple H, proclaiming that Rollins never defeated him clean without interference and provoking Triple H into booking them in a match, which Ambrose subsequently lost. A few hours after Raw went off the air, it was reported that Ambrose had informed WWE officials that he would not be renewing his contract and would be leaving the company shortly after WrestleMania 35. WWE subsequently confirmed his decision in a statement. It was reported that he had been offered an improved contract by WWE, which he turned down due to long-standing frustration with the creative direction of his character and a particular dislike of the "hokey" material he had been given.

After weeks of teasing a reunion, Ambrose reunited with Rollins and the recently returned Reigns on the March 4 episode of Raw, after they assisted Ambrose from an attack by Baron Corbin, Bobby Lashley, Drew McIntyre, and Elias the previous week, reverting Ambrose to a face once again. At Fastlane on March 10, The Shield defeated the team of McIntyre, Lashley, and Corbin. In his final singles matches in WWE, Ambrose would lose to McIntyre several times on Raw. On the April 8 episode of Raw, Ambrose was scheduled to face Bobby Lashley in what was billed as Ambrose's last match on Raw. However, the match never took place as Lashley insulted Ambrose's wife, Renee Young, resulting in a brawl that ended with Ambrose being slammed through the announce table. After Raw went off the air, Ambrose joined Rollins and Reigns to address the fans, thank them for their support, and comment on his past accomplishments before celebrating with his Shield teammates. The following week on Raw, he made another appearance after the show went off the air. His final contractual match occurred at a special event called The Shield's Final Chapter on April 21, where he, Reigns, and Rollins defeated the team of Corbin, Lashley, and McIntyre.He revealed that he was paid only $500 for wrestling in the match which is the minimum WWE could pay him for the event. His contract expired on April 30.

On Chris Jericho's Talk is Jericho podcast in May 2019, Good recounted his departure from WWE, though he began by saying he was grateful for his time there, and cited achieving success. He decided to leave WWE after Vince McMahon made him give a promo on Raw where his character would get inoculated from various diseases out of fear of catching a virus from the fans. Good felt after this segment that his character was irreparably damaged. He left WWE citing the cause as mental and emotional exhaustion after six years of explaining to McMahon how his ideas for Good's character were "stupid". Due to McMahon's control over the company, Good had to follow McMahon's writing, which left him unhappy. Good came to dread promos, which were previously his favorite part of performing as a wrestler, to the point of feeling physically ill. His experience was corroborated by both Jericho and various anonymous WWE wrestlers and staff.

All Elite Wrestling

Early feuds (2019–2020)
On May 1, Good—having reverted to his former Jon Moxley gimmick and name—posted a video on his Twitter account to promote the gimmick's return, which showed him breaking out of a prison. The video was created by wrestler-turned-filmmaker Nick Mondo. On May 25, Moxley made his unannounced debut for All Elite Wrestling (AEW) during Double or Nothing, the company's inaugural event, attacking Chris Jericho, Kenny Omega, and the referee after Jericho and Omega's main event match, thus establishing himself as an antihero character. Shortly after, it was announced that Moxley had signed a multi-year contract. Moxley had his AEW debut match at the Fyter Fest event in June, where he defeated Joey Janela in an unsanctioned match. After the match, Moxley was attacked by Omega in retaliation for his previous assault. A match between the two was scheduled for All Out on August 31. However, a week before the event, Moxley was forced to pull out after being diagnosed with a MRSA staph infection in his elbow, and would undergo surgery to remove it. AEW subsequently revealed Pac as Moxley's replacement, and the match was rescheduled for the Full Gear event. Moxley made his return on October 2, during the premiere episode of Dynamite, taking out Omega during the latter's main event match. In the main event of Full Gear on November 9, Moxley defeated Omega in an unsanctioned Lights Out match.

After Full Gear, Moxley indicated his intentions to challenge for the AEW World Championship. Chris Jericho, who held the championship, attempted to bribe Moxley into joining his group, The Inner Circle. On the January 8, 2020 episode of Dynamite, Moxley initially accepted the proposal and seemingly joined the group, before revealing it was a ploy and turning on them moments later. Moxley was entered into a tournament to determine the number one contender for the championship, defeating Sammy Guevara and Pac to win.

AEW World Champion (2020–2021)

Moxley faced Jericho for the AEW World Championship at Revolution on February 29, where he won the championship, becoming the first person to hold titles in AEW and NJPW simultaneously. Moxley made his first defense of the championship on the April 15 episode of Dynamite, defeating Jake Hager in an Empty Arena No Holds Barred match. Moxley then made further successful title defenses against Mr. Brodie Lee at Double or Nothing on May 23, Brian Cage at Fight for the Fallen on July 15, and Darby Allin on the August 5 episode of Dynamite. Moxley then moved onto a feud with MJF, who campaigned against Moxley's championship reign and decreed that fans deserved a better champion. The two faced at All Out on September 5, where Moxley emerged victorious. 

Later that month, Moxley began a highly acclaimed rivalry with former friend Eddie Kingston, who was jealous of Moxley's success. He defended the championship against Kingston on the September 23 episode of Dynamite, which he won by making Kingston pass out to a chokehold. After retaining the championship against Lance Archer on the October 14 episode of Dynamite, Moxley was attacked by Kingston, who protested that Moxley had never made him submit. At Full Gear on November 7, Moxley defeated Kingston in an "I quit" match to retain the championship. Following this, Moxley rekindled his feud with Kenny Omega. At Winter Is Coming on December 2, Moxley lost the championship to Omega, thus ending his record-setting reign at 277 days, and giving Moxley his first singles loss in AEW. After taking an absence, Moxley returned at the New Year's Smash event on January 6, 2021, but he was attacked by Omega and his allies The Good Brothers (Karl Anderson and Doc Gallows). Moxley challenged Omega for the championship at Revolution on March 7, in an Exploding Barbed Wire Deathmatch, but lost.

After losing to Omega, Moxley began an alliance with his erstwhile rival Eddie Kingston, who came to Moxley's rescue after the match at Revolution. Over the following weeks, Moxley and Kingston would continue to feud with Omega and his allies, particularly focusing on Omega's friends The Young Bucks (Matt Jackson and Nick Jackson). At the Double or Nothing event in May, Moxley and Kingston challenged The Young Bucks for the AEW World Tag Team Championship, but they were defeated. On September 5 at All Out, Moxley defeated Satoshi Kojima. On the October 6 episode of Dynamite, Moxley competed in a Casino Ladder Match for an opportunity at the AEW World Championship, but the match was won by Adam Page. Also that month, he was inserted into a tournament to determine the next challenger for the world championship. Moxley defeated Preston "10" Vance to advance to the semi-finals, but he was withdrawn from the tournament after it was revealed that he had entered a rehabilitation program for alcoholism. Miro was subsequently unveiled as his replacement.

Record-setting world championship reigns (2022–present)

Moxley returned in January 2022, sporting a healthier and more clean-cut look. He began a storyline with Bryan Danielson, who offered to team up with him, but Moxley stated that he would only consider teaming up with Danielson if they wrestled each other first. Moxley defeated Danielson at Revolution in March, but the two began brawling after their match; William Regal, once a mentor to both men on separate occasions, made his surprise debut to break up the fight and force them to shake hands. With Regal as their manager, they formed a team which would later be named the Blackpool Combat Club (BCC) in reference to Regal's career beginnings in England. The group would begin a storyline with Wheeler Yuta, who would aim to join the group. After first losing to Danielson, Yuta was defeated by Moxley in a critically acclaimed match on the April 8 episode of Rampage, earning the faction's respect, and joining them. At Double or Nothing on May 29, Moxley and Danielson teamed with Eddie Kingston, Santana and Ortiz to face the Jericho Appreciation Society (Chris Jericho, Jake Hager, Daniel Garcia, Angelo Parker, and Matt Menard) in an Anarchy in the Arena match, but lost. 

On the June 3 episode of Rampage, AEW World Champion CM Punk announced he would not be able to defend his championship against scheduled challenger Hiroshi Tanahashi on June 26 at AEW x NJPW: Forbidden Door due to injury. On the June 8 episode of Dynamite, Moxley defeated Kyle O'Reilly, the winner of a Casino Battle Royale in the show's opener, to earn the chance to face for the interim championship at the event. On June 12 at New Japan Pro-Wrestling's Dominion 6.12 in Osaka-jo Hall event, Tanahashi defeated Hirooki Goto to be confirmed as Moxley's opponent at Forbidden Door. At the event, Moxley defeated Tanahashi to win the interim AEW World Championship. Also that month, the debuting Claudio Castagnoli would join the Blackpool Combat Club as its newest member.

At the Quake by the Lake special episode of Dynamite on August 10, the lineal AEW World Champion CM Punk returned and confronted Moxley, entering into a title dispute. A match to determine the undisputed AEW World Champion was then scheduled at All Out, however, due to heated confrontations between the two, it was announced that the match would instead take place on the August 24 episode of Dynamite, in which Moxley quickly defeated Punk to win his record-setting second AEW World Championship, becoming the undisputed AEW World Champion in the process. The following week on Dynamite, Moxley laid out an open challenge for anyone to face him at All Out, which was accepted by Punk. At All Out on September 4, Moxley was defeated by Punk, losing the undisputed championship and ending his reign at eleven days. 

Shortly following the event, Punk was suspended by AEW after getting into a legitimate backstage altercation with Kenny Omega and The Young Bucks. As a result, the AEW World Championship was vacated, and Moxley was then inserted into a tournament to crown a new champion. At Dynamite: Grand Slam on September 21, Moxley defeated Bryan Danielson in the tournament final to win the vacant title and become the first ever three-time AEW World Champion. On October 7, it was announced via press release that Moxley had signed a five-year exclusive contract extension with AEW that will see him take on mentorship and coaching roles, as well as continue to perform for the promotion as an in-ring wrestler. On the October 18 episode of Dynamite: Title Tuesday, Moxley retained the AEW World Championship against Adam Page, in a match in which the latter suffered a legitimate injury after landing off a clothesline, causing a match stoppage. At Full Gear on November 19, Moxley lost the championship to MJF, after he was betrayed by Regal.

In late-November, Moxley started a feud with the returning Adam Page, during which he began showing signs of a heel turn alongside Yuta and Castagnoli. On the January 11, 2023 episode of Dynamite, Page defeated Moxley; however, in a rematch on the February 1 episode, Moxley defeated Page after reversing a submission hold into a pinfall. The two faced each other in a Texas Deatmatch at the Revolution pay-per-view, which Moxley lost by submission.

On the March 8 2023 episode of Dynamite, after Moxley and Claudio Castagnoli defeated The Dark Order members John Silver and Alex Reynolds, they beat down Hangman Page alongside Yuta, thus officially turning all three of them heel.

New Japan Pro-Wrestling

IWGP United States Heavyweight Champion (2019–2021)

After weeks of New Japan Pro-Wrestling (NJPW) airing videos of a mystery man targeting IWGP United States Heavyweight Champion Juice Robinson, Moxley was revealed as the culprit in May 2019, challenging Robinson for a title match at the final night of the Best of the Super Juniors 26 tournament on June 5. At the event, he defeated Robinson in his NJPW in-ring debut to win the championship, making him the first wrestler to hold both IWGP and WWE United States Championships. Following Moxley's original challenge, AEW CEO Tony Khan stated that Moxley would be able to take independent and international bookings during the summer before AEW's television deal started in the fall of that year. However during an interview with Nikkan Sports, Good clarified that he would continue to appear for NJPW while being signed to AEW. At Dominion 6.9 in Osaka-jo Hall on June 9, Moxley defeated Shota Umino before declaring himself as an entrant in the 2019 G1 Climax tournament. From July to August, Moxley competed in the B Block of the G1 Climax, defeating Taichi in his first tournament match. He then went undefeated in the tournament with wins over Jeff Cobb, Tomohiro Ishii, Shingo Takagi, and Tetsuya Naito, before suffering his first loss to Toru Yano. He then lost his next three matches to Jay White, Hirooki Goto, and Juice Robinson, failing to advance to the tournament finals with a final standing of 10 points (five wins and four losses).

On October 13, after he was unable to defend the United States Heavyweight Championship in a scheduled match against Robinson due to travel issues stemming from Typhoon Hagibis, Moxley agreed to vacate the championship. He was replaced in the match by Lance Archer, who defeated Robinson to win the championship. On December 9, Moxley returned and interrupted Archer after his final match in the 2019 World Tag League tournament, attacking both Archer and Minoru Suzuki before challenging the former to a Texas Deathmatch for the United States Heavyweight Championship at Wrestle Kingdom 14 in January 2020. During the first night of the event, he defeated Archer by knockout to capture the championship for the second time, and subsequently successfully retained the championship against Robinson the following night, ending their long-running feud. After the match, he was confronted and beaten down by Suzuki. Moxley successfully defended the championship against Suzuki at The New Beginning in Osaka in February. This would be Moxley's final match in NJPW for over a year, due to travelling issues relating to the COVID-19 pandemic. On August 1, Moxley surpassed Kenny Omega as the longest reigning United States Heavyweight Champion.

On the January 29, 2021 episode of Strong, Moxley returned after an eleven-month absence and attacked Kenta, who had earned a future United States Heavyweight Championship match the previous year by winning the New Japan Cup USA. The match took place at The New Beginning USA on February 26, where Moxley defeated Kenta to retain the championship. Through NJPW's partnership with AEW, Moxley successfully defended the United States Heavyweight Championship against Yuji Nagata on the May 12 episode of AEW's television show Dynamite, marking the first time a NJPW championship was defended at an AEW event.

At AEW's Fyter Fest event on July 14, Moxley again successfully defended the title against Karl Anderson. However, on the second night of Fyter Fest the following week, Moxley lost the championship to Lance Archer in a Texas Deathmatch, ending his record-breaking reign at 564 days with five successful defenses. At the Resurgence event on August 14, Moxley teamed with Nagata to face The Good Brothers, but they were defeated.

Sporadic appearances (2021–present)
On the November 27 episode of Strong, Moxley teamed with Eddie Kingston to face Minoru Suzuki and Lance Archer in a Philadelphia Street Fight, which the latter team won. Moxley returned to the promotion to face Will Ospreay at the Windy City Riot event on April 16, 2022, where he was victorious in the main event. At the Capital Collision event on May 14, Moxley challenged for the United States Heavyweight Championship in a fatal four-way match including Ospreay, Juice Robinson, and Hiroshi Tanahashi, which Robinson won. At the Music City Mayhem event on July 30, Moxley defeated El Desperado in a no disqualification match.

Return to the independent circuit (2019–present)
Starting in June 2019, Moxley made sporadic appearances for several independent promotions such as Northeast Wrestling (NEW) and Future Stars of Wrestling (FSW). He was also set to wrestle matches for Over the Top Wrestling (OTT) and Game Changer Wrestling (GCW), but the scheduled events were cancelled due to the COVID-19 pandemic. On October 11, 2020, Moxley defeated Chris Dickinson at Josh Barnett's Bloodsport 3. He then defeated Davey Boy Smith Jr. in the main event of Josh Barnett's Bloodsport 5 on February 20, 2021, before losing to Josh Barnett at Josh Barnett's Bloodsport 6 on April 8. 

At GCW's The Art of War Games pay-per-view in September 2021, Moxley defeated Matt Cardona as a surprise opponent to win the GCW World Championship. On January 23, 2022, Moxley retained the GCW World Championship against Homicide at The Wrld on GCW event. At Josh Barnett's Bloodsport 8 in March, Moxley defeated Biff Busick. At GCW's Fight Club event on October 8, Moxley lost the GCW World Championship to Nick Gage in a title vs. career match, ending his reign at 399 days.

Professional wrestling style, persona, and reception

Good was given the Jon Moxley ring name shortly before his first match by a fellow wrestler, who had misheard the name of James Van Der Beek's character Jonathan Moxon in the 1999 film Varsity Blues. He later said, "I'd probably been thinking about names for years and years, but I had no ideas. ... So, right before I'm about to go out the ring announcer said, 'What's the name?' I didn't have one. ... This other wrestler guy was just like, 'It's like the Varsity Blues guy. He's like the guy from Varsity Blues. Jonathan Moxley.' They're like, 'That's cool.' I was too nervous to say yes or no. ... Actually, in the movie, it's Moxon. So the guy screwed up the name a little bit. It wasn't my idea at all, it was just foisted upon me."

After debuting on WWE television as Dean Ambrose with The Shield, Good utilized a headlock driver, the Dirty Deeds, as a finishing move. Soon after The Shield's initial split in 2014, he did not feel comfortable using a headlock driver on some wrestlers, so the Dirty Deeds was changed to a double underhook DDT. Upon his departure from WWE, he changed his finisher to a lifted underhook DDT or a double underhook brainbuster, the Paradigm Shift (in AEW) or the Death Rider (in NJPW and later in AEW). During his tenure in WWE's FCW territory, he used William Regal's finishing moves the Knee Trembler (a running knee lift) and the Regal Stretch (a cross-legged arm trap STF) to mock Regal during their feud.

Referred to as the "Lunatic Fringe" since his time in The Shield after the nickname of Cincinnati radio station WEBN (which itself got it from the song of the same name by Red Rider), Ambrose's WWE gimmick saw him characterized as a mentally unstable and unpredictable wildcard. His gimmick has been compared to Heath Ledger's Joker from the 2008 film The Dark Knight. After becoming a villain in late 2018, Ambrose began proclaiming himself the "Moral Compass of WWE", and this revamped character—with his use of gas masks, fur-lined coats, military attire, and a SWAT-like team  to do his bidding—invited comparisons to Tom Hardy's Bane from the 2012 sequel The Dark Knight Rises.

Ambrose's booking during his feuds with Seth Rollins and Bray Wyatt in 2014 was criticized by commentators, including James Caldwell of the Pro Wrestling Torch, who stated that although "he's a utility main eventer", his lack of victories indicated that he was not "a guy" that WWE was positioning "for a 2-3 year sustained run on top". Ambrose's post-Shield run as a heroic character gained significant popularity, with him being cheered over fellow heroic character Roman Reigns when they faced off in three world title matches (Payback and Survivor Series in 2015 and Fastlane in 2016). Ambrose was voted as the Most Popular Wrestler of the Year by Pro Wrestling Illustrated readers in 2014 and 2015.

Good's reversion to his Jon Moxley gimmick and subsequent debut at AEW's Double or Nothing after leaving WWE in 2019 was widely praised, with Phillip Martinez of Newsweek commenting that Good had caused "the wrestling world to erupt" after his surprise appearance. Justin Barrasso of Sports Illustrated opined that Moxley was "the cornerstone of AEW." Variety also attributed Moxley as one of AEW's biggest ratings attractions for their weekly broadcast. Moxley uses a version of the song "Wild Thing" by X as his entrance theme, as tribute to Japanese wrestler Atsushi Onita, who utilized the same song.

Moxley's match with Tomohiro Ishii during the G1 Climax in July 2019 was met with critical acclaim. Deadspins Luis Paez-Pumar noted how the tournament offered an excellent platform for Moxley to shine following his departure from WWE and notably singled out his match against Ishii, calling it "almost certainly Moxley's best singles match ever, under any name, but it felt significant in another sense... it was good, brutal fun to watch, but it also pointed a way forward for Moxley not just as an attraction, but rather as a brilliant and brilliantly violent wrestler". The match was also awarded five stars by esteemed wrestling journalist Dave Meltzer of the Wrestling Observer Newsletter, with Meltzer remarking, "I think this was the first time I ever saw a match where at the 17 second mark I already felt it was going to be a four star match...  this is a four star match already, right now, and they're building from there."

Other media
As Dean Ambrose, Good made his acting debut in the WWE produced action film 12 Rounds 3: Lockdown (2015), in which he starred as detective John Shaw. He also made an uncredited cameo in the WWE film Countdown (2016). Under his real name, he appeared in the sports action film Cagefighter: Worlds Collide (2020) as Randy Stone, a professional wrestler who crosses over to MMA and fights the film's protagonist.

Good, as Dean Ambrose, appears as a playable character in the video games WWE 2K14, WWE 2K15, WWE 2K16, WWE 2K17, WWE 2K18, and WWE 2K19. He will also appear in the upcoming video game AEW Fight Forever, as Jon Moxley.

In 2011, Smart Mark Video released Stories From the Streets: The Jon Moxley Story, a DVD featuring several of Good's matches in CZW, HWA, and IPW, as well as a two-and-a-half hour shoot interview with Good. He has also spoken on several podcasts such as Colt Cabana's Art of Wrestling in December 2014, Chris Jericho's Talk is Jericho in May 2019 (in which he talked about his departure from WWE), and AEW's Unrestricted podcast in February 2020 (for which he was the inaugural guest). Good's autobiography Mox was released on November 2, 2021.

Filmography

Personal life
Good began dating Canadian-American backstage interviewer and on-air personality Renee Paquette, known in WWE as Renee Young, in 2013. They previously lived near Las Vegas, where they were married in an impromptu ceremony at their home in the early hours of April 9, 2017. Their first child, a daughter named Nora Murphy Good, was born on June 13, 2021. In November 2021, they relocated to his hometown of Cincinnati to be closer to both his family and Paquette's family in her hometown of Toronto.

Good has referred to himself as a loner, which he has often incorporated into his onscreen character. He has also called himself a minimalist, revealing that he drove to WWE's training center in his rundown car with only a bag of clothes and the money in his pocket upon accepting their contract offer. He was roommates with fellow wrestler Big Cass during this time and later moved out when he was promoted to the main roster, leaving behind thousands of dollars worth of merchandise sent to him by WWE and telling Cass to "give it to charity or something". He then moved into his new apartment, which he left unfurnished because he reasoned that he would be traveling most of the time.

A notably private person, Good refused to use the Twitter profile WWE created for him in 2012. He explained in a 2014 interview, "As far as social media and all that, I understand connecting with fans on a different level, but I don't feel the need to open myself up to the opinion of everybody in the world with a phone or computer. I just don't get being connected to everybody on such a superficial level like that. There's a kind of mystery when you don't put yourself out like that. ... People start to kind of create their own version of you in their head." He later set up Twitter and Instagram profiles upon leaving WWE in 2019, though he still rarely uses them.

In order to be closer to the recommended doctors during his recovery from an injured arm in 2018, Good lived for a period of time in Birmingham, Alabama, where he contracted MRSA in his arm. He later claimed that the infection nearly killed him. In November 2021, at Good's request, Tony Khan announced that Good had checked himself into rehab to address his alcoholism. He returned to wrestling three months later.

Championships and accomplishments

 All Elite Wrestling
 AEW World Championship (3 times)
 AEW Interim World Championship (1 time)
 AEW World Championship #1 Contender Tournament (2020)
AEW Interim World Championship Eliminator Series (2022)
AEW Grand Slam Tournament of Champions (2022)
 Combat Zone Wrestling
 CZW World Heavyweight Championship (2 times)
 Full Impact Pro
 FIP World Heavyweight Championship (1 time)
 Game Changer Wrestling
 GCW World Championship (1 time)
 Heartland Wrestling Association
 HWA Heavyweight Championship (3 times)
 HWA Tag Team Championship (5 times) – with Jimmy Turner (1), Ric Byrne (1), Cody Hawk (1) and King Vu (2)
 Drake Younger Invitational Tournament (2009)
 Mad-Pro Wrestling
 MPW Heavyweight Championship (1 time)
 MPW Tag Team Championship (1 times) – with Dustin Rayz
 Insanity Pro Wrestling
 IPW World Heavyweight Championship (2 times)
 IPW Mid-American Championship (1 time)
 International Wrestling Association
 IWA Tag Team Championship (1 time) – with Hade Vansen
 New Japan Pro-Wrestling
 IWGP United States Heavyweight Championship (2 times)
 New York Post
 Male Wrestler of the Year (2022)
 Pro Wrestling Illustrated
 Feud of the Year (2014) 
 Most Popular Wrestler of the Year (2014, 2015, 2022)
 Inspirational Wrestler of the Year (2022)
 Wrestler of the Year (2020)
 Ranked No. 1 of the top 500 singles wrestlers in the PWI 500 in 2020
 Rolling Stone
 Best Briefly Resuscitated Storyline (2015) 
 Most Likeable Loose Cannon (2014)
 Sports Illustrated
 Male Wrestler of the Year (2019)
 Ranked No. 2 of the top 10 wrestlers in 2022
 Westside Xtreme Wrestling
 wXw World Tag Team Championship (1 time) – with Sami Callihan
 wXw World Tag Team Title Tournament (2009) with Sami Callihan 
 Wrestling Observer Newsletter
 Best Brawler (2020–2022)
 Best Pro Wrestling Book (2021) 
 Feud of the Year (2020) 
 Shad Gaspard/Jon Huber Memorial Award (2021)
 United States/Canada MVP (2020, 2022)
 Wrestler of the Year (2020, 2022)
 Worst Feud of the Year (2013) – 
 WWE
 WWE Championship (1 time)
 WWE Intercontinental Championship (3 times)
 WWE Raw Tag Team Championship (2 times) – with Seth Rollins
 WWE United States Championship (1 time)
 27th Triple Crown Champion
 Eighth Grand Slam Champion (under current format; 16th overall)
 Money in the Bank (2016)
 Slammy Award (5 times)
 Breakout Star of the Year (2013, 2014) – 
 Faction of the Year (2013, 2014) – 
 Trending Now (Hashtag) of the Year (2013) – 
 WWE Year-End Awards (2 times)
 Best Reunion (2018) – 
 Return of the Year (2018)

Luchas de Apuestas record

Bibliography

Notes

References

External links

 
 
 
 
 

1985 births
21st-century American male actors
21st-century professional wrestlers
All Elite Wrestling personnel
American male film actors
American male professional wrestlers
Expatriate professional wrestlers in Japan
IWGP United States Champions
Living people
Male actors from Cincinnati
NWA/WCW/WWE United States Heavyweight Champions
Professional wrestlers from Ohio
Sportspeople from Cincinnati
The Authority (professional wrestling) members
WWF/WWE Intercontinental Champions
WWE Champions
WWE Grand Slam champions
AEW World Champions
American expatriate sportspeople in Japan
FIP World Heavyweight Champions
CZW World Heavyweight Champions